Alphabet Workers Union (AWU), also informally referred to as the Google Union, is a trade union of workers employed at Alphabet Inc., Google's parent company, with a membership of over 800, in a company with 130,000 employees, not including temps, contractors, and vendors. It was announced on January 4, 2021 with an initial membership of over 400, after over a year of secret organizing, and the union includes all types of workers at Alphabet, including full-time, temporary, vendors and contractors of all job types.

It has been called a minority union and a solidarity union, and is not registered with the National Labor Relations Board, and thus cannot engage in collective bargaining. It is part of the Campaign to Organize Digital Employees, an effort to organize unions at tech companies, and affiliated with the Communications Workers of America, a larger trade union.

History 
On 4 February 2021, the union expressed support of datacenter workers, including Shannon Wait, employed through contractors, who were demanding the right to drink water at work and discussing wages and other working conditions. Subsequently Wait was suspended by the company for her pro-union activities, which AWU protested against through a legal charge. On 10 February, the union announced Wait was readmitted to work after pressure from the union.

Positions 
The union says it fights to improve the workers' wages; fights against abuse, retaliation and discrimination; and advocates on behalf of disadvantaged workers at Google such as contractors. It fights to stop sexual harassment in the workplace. It aims to stop Google from allowing its social media platforms such as YouTube to function as a hub for right-wing extremism and white supremacy.

The union argued that Alphabet may do wrongful things for the sake of profit, and that having a union allows workers to make the world a better place by pressuring the company to drop its bad practices and ensure tech labor is used for good purposes. The union also asserts that the company has retaliated against workers for speaking out, and it says it would allow workers to have a say in how things are run and act as a mechanism for workers to speak safely, being protected by the collective strength of workers.

See also 

2018 Google walkouts
 Google worker organization
 Tech Workers Coalition

References

External links 
 

 
2021 establishments in the United States
Trade unions established in 2021
Communications Workers of America
Solidarity unionism
Tech sector trade unions
Criticism of Google
Google